Fond d'Or Bay is a bay on the east side of the island of Saint Lucia, in the center of the coast.  The Fond d'Or River has its mouth in the bay.

See also
List of rivers of Saint Lucia

References

Bays of Saint Lucia